Paradise Island is an island in The Bahamas.

Paradise Island may also refer to:

Geography
Paradise Island, Florida, one of three islands in Lake Tohopekaliga, Florida, USA
Paradise Island, also known as Heaven Island, an  island near Marmaris in Turkey
Paradise Island, known locally as Lankanfinolhu, an island in the Kaafu Atoll in the Maldives
Paradise Island, an  island in the Palmyra Atoll, administered by USA

Arts, entertainment, and media
Paradise Island (album), an album by Lake
Paradise Island (film), a 1930 American South Seas film directed by Bert Glennon
 Paradise Island (musical), a musical produced by Guy Lombardo and staged at the Nikon at Jones Beach Theater in 1961 and 1962 
Paradise Island (video game), a video game for mobile devices
Themyscira (DC Comics), a fictional island nation in the DC Comics universe, formerly called Paradise Island
Paradise Island (TV series), British TV series in the 1950s

Brands and enterprises
Paradise Island Airlines, a defunct airline
Paradise Island Resort, a resort on Lankanfinolhu, an island in the Kaafu Atoll in the Maldives